Bill Kimber (born January 31, 1936) is a former American football defensive end. He played for the New York Giants from 1959 to 1960 and for the Boston Patriots in 1961.

References

1936 births
Living people
American football defensive ends
Florida State Seminoles football players
New York Giants players
Boston Patriots players